Cody Law (born March 24, 1995) is an American professional mixed martial artist and graduated collegiate wrestler currently competing in the featherweight division of Bellator MMA. As a folkstyle wrestler, he was an NCAA Division II champion and two-time DII All-American out of University of Pittsburgh-Johnstown and a PIAA champion as a high schooler.

Background 
Cody is the son of Crystal Law and has three siblings, one of them is his younger brother named Triston, whom he was teammates with at PSU.

Wrestling career

High school 
Law was born in Windber, Pennsylvania and attended Forest Hills High School. He didn't have particular success as a freshman, posting a negative record (16 wins, 17 losses) and placing sixth at districts (not high enough for regionals). He improved his resume as a sophomore, posting a record of 26 wins and 7 losses and placing third at districts and sixth at regionals, but still not qualifying for state. He kept improving as a junior and posted a record of 36 wins and just 2 losses, the first one on the districts finals (finishing as the runner-up) and the second one came after winning the regionals and reaching the PIAA state finals, where he lost by only one point (2-3). As a senior, he had his most successful season, posting an unbeaten record of 34 victories and no defeats, placing first at districts, regionals and the state championships. Overall, Law posted 112 wins and 26 losses during his career and was in the top 15 of the national high school rankings at 160 pounds.

University 
After finishing his high school education, Law attended Pennsylvania State University, that is known for having one of the most successful wrestling teams at the time (still has), having won the NCAA Division I's team titles in the last three seasons at that time. As a redshirt athlete (13'-14'), he compiled a record of 14 victories and 4 defeats in Open tournaments. He then competed as a freshman at 157 pounds, compiling a record of 13 wins and 6 losses during regular season and not competing at that year's NCAA DI championships. After wrestling season, he competed at the 15' Junior Nationals, where he placed third.

After that season, he chose to transfer to the University of Pittsburgh-Johnstown, that had an NCAA Division II wrestling program. He explained:
However, this led him unable to compete as a sophomore.

As a junior, he became the top-ranked wrestler in the country and posted a record of 17-1 during regular season. During post-season, he won a PSAC conference title and became an All-American with a fourth-place finish at the NCAA DII championships. As a senior, he had his most successful season, compiling a record of 25 wins and 2 losses (both of those losses to Division I athletes), winning the National Championship and becoming a two-time All-American.

Mixed martial arts career

Early career 
Law began his amateur MMA career a couple of months after he graduated from UPJ and amassed a 5–0 record with three stoppage wins (two submissions, one knockout) and two decisions.

Bellator MMA 
On September 1, 2020, Law announced that he had signed a contract with Bellator MMA. He made his professional debut against Orlando Ortega on October 29, 2020, at Bellator 250, winning the bout via submission in the first round.

In the sophomore bout of his professional career, Law faced Kenny Champion at Bellator 254 on December 10, 2020. After dominating the contest, he eventually won the fight via technical knockout at the last minute of the third round.

Law faced Nathan Ghareeb on April 9, 2021 at Bellator 256. He won the bout via unanimous decision.

Law faced Theodore Macuka on July 16, 2021 at Bellator 262. He won the bout via TKO in the first round.

Law faced Colton Hamm on November 12, 2021 at Bellator 271. He won the bout after knocking Hamm out via ground and pound in the first round.

Law was scheduled to face Johnny Soto on March 12, 2022 at Bellator 276. However, Soto was forced to pull out of the bout and was replaced by James Adcock. He won the bout after knocking Adcock out in the first round.

Law faced James Gonzalez at Bellator 282 on June 24, 2022. In an upset, he lost the bout via unanimous decision.

Law faced Cris Lencioni on December 9, 2022 at Bellator 289. He lost the fight via split decision.

Championships and accomplishments

Folkstyle wrestling 
National Collegiate Athletic Association
NCAA Division II 157 lb National Championship out of University of Pittsburgh-Johnstown (2018)
NCAA Division II All-American out of the University of Pittsburgh-Johnstown (2017, 2018)
Pennsylvania Interscholastic Athletic Association
PIAA 160 lb State Runner-up out of Forest Hills High School (2012)
PIAA 160 lb State Champion out of Forest Hills High School (2013)

Mixed martial arts record

|-
|Loss
|align=center|6–2
|Cris Lencioni
|Decision (split)
|Bellator 289
|
|align=center|3
|align=center|5:00
|Uncasville, Connecticut, United States
|
|-
|Loss
|align=center|6–1
|James Gonzalez
|Decision (unanimous)
|Bellator 282
|
|align=center|3
|align=center|5:00
|Uncasville, Connecticut, United States
|
|-
| Win
| align=center|6–0
| James Adcock
| KO (punches)
| Bellator 276
| 
| align=center|1
| align=center|1:17
| St. Louis, Missouri, United States
|
|-
| Win
| align=center|5–0
| Colton Hamm
| KO (elbows)
| Bellator 271
| 
| align=center| 1
| align=center| 4:21
| Hollywood, Florida, United States
|
|-
|Win
|align=center|4–0
|Theodore Macuka
|TKO (punches)
|Bellator 262
|
|align=center|1
|align=center|1:54
|Uncasville, Connecticut, United States
|
|-
|Win
|align=center|3–0
|Nathan Ghareeb	
|Decision (unanimous)
|Bellator 256 
|
|align=center|3
|align=center|5:00
|Uncasville, Connecticut, United States 
|
|-
|Win
|align=center|2–0
|Kenny Champion
|TKO (punches)
|Bellator 254
|
|align=center|3
|align=center|4:44
|Uncasville, Connecticut, United States
|
|-
|Win
|align=center|1–0
|Orlando Ortega
|Submission (D'Arce choke)
|Bellator 250
|
|align=center|1
|align=center|2:41
|Uncasville, Connecticut, United States
|
|-

NCAA record 

! colspan="8"| NCAA Division II Championships Matches
|-
!  Res.
!  Record
!  Opponent
!  Score
!  Date
!  Event
|-
! style=background:white colspan=6 |2018 NCAA (DII) Championships  at 157 lbs
|-
|Win
|8-1
|align=left|Larry Bomstad
|style="font-size:88%"|6-3
|style="font-size:88%" rowspan=4|March 10, 2018
|style="font-size:88%" rowspan=4|2018 NCAA Division II Wrestling Championships
|-
|Win
|7-1
|align=left|Jared Reis
|style="font-size:88%"|7-4
|-
|Win
|6-1
|align=left|Cortez Arredondo
|style="font-size:88%"|7-1
|-
|Win
|5-1
|align=left|Heath Lange
|style="font-size:88%"|TF 18-1
|-
! style=background:white colspan=6 |2017 NCAA (DII) Championships 4th at 157 lbs
|-
|Win
|4-1
|align=left| Joey White
|style="font-size:88%"|4-3
|style="font-size:88%" rowspan=5|March 11, 2017
|style="font-size:88%" rowspan=5|2017 NCAA Division II Wrestling Championships
|-
|Win
|3-1
|align=left| Heath Lange
|style="font-size:88%"|Fall
|-
|Win
|2-1
|align=left|Kyle Fantin
|style="font-size:88%"|DQ
|-
|Loss
|1-1
|align=left| DeAndre` Johnson
|style="font-size:88%"|SV-1 10-12
|-
|Win
|1-0
|align=left|Dylan Herman
|style="font-size:88%"|MD 17-4
|-

See also
 List of current Bellator fighters
 List of male mixed martial artists

References

External links
 

1995 births
Living people
People from Windber, Pennsylvania
Mixed martial artists from Pennsylvania
Pennsylvania State University alumni
American male mixed martial artists
Mixed martial artists utilizing collegiate wrestling
Mixed martial artists utilizing Brazilian jiu-jitsu
American male sport wrestlers
Amateur wrestlers
Penn State Nittany Lions wrestlers
American practitioners of Brazilian jiu-jitsu